Henry Rohner (September 7, 1919 – August 2, 2006) was a public servant from Mount Pleasant, Wisconsin. He served one term in the Wisconsin State Assembly.

Biography
Rohner was born in Caledonia, Wisconsin to Paul and Katherine (née Schraepfer) Rohner. He graduated from William Horlick High School in 1937. He worked as a tool-and-die maker for Belle City Malleable and the J.I. Case Company.  On October 4, 1941, at Holy Innocents Episcopal Church, he married Marjorie E. Acklam.

During World War II, he enlisted and served in the United States Navy. After returning from the war, Rohner founded the Henry Rohner Implement Company and was a Ford Tractor and Equipment Dealer for over 23 years.  He was also a member of the volunteer fire and rescue squad in Mount Pleasant, Wisconsin, and rose to the rank of Assistant Chief.  He was a member of the American Legion, the Racine City Humane Society, and the United Auto Workers.

Political career
Rohner's first public office was Mount Pleasant's Civil Defense Director, 1955 through 1961.  He was also a member of the Mount Pleasant School Board from 1957 until its merger with the Racine School District in 1961.

In 1961, Rohner ran for and was elected to two offices—Racine County Supervisor and Mount Pleasant Town Chairman.  He would remain on the Racine County Board until 1966, and would remain Town Chairman for 14 years, ending in 1975.

Rohner was elected to the Wisconsin State Assembly in 1972, as a Republican. He ran for re-election in 1974, but was defeated by Democrat Marcel Dandeneau of Caledonia.

Death
Rohner died in his sleep, on August 2, 2006. He was survived by his wife, four children, eleven grandchildren, and ten great-grandchildren. He was interred at West Lawn Memorial Park, in Mount Pleasant, on August 4, 2006.

Electoral history

References

Politicians from Racine, Wisconsin
County supervisors in Wisconsin
Republican Party members of the Wisconsin State Assembly
School board members in Wisconsin
Mayors of places in Wisconsin
Military personnel from Wisconsin
United States Navy sailors
United States Navy personnel of World War II
American firefighters
1919 births
2006 deaths
20th-century American politicians
People from Mount Pleasant, Wisconsin
William Horlick High School alumni